William Henry Hitchener was a British author.

He had two books published in 1813, St. Leonard's Forest, Vol. 1.2 (London Chapple 1813 ) and The Tower of Ravenwold, Vol. 1.2 (London Chapple 1813 ). Both books are travel books.

Year of birth missing
Year of death missing
British travel writers